Helluva Good Luck is a 1999 Czech fantasy film directed by Zdeněk Troška. It is inspired by Jan Drda's story "Brave Honza". A sequel was released in 2001.

Plot
The film is about a youngster Jan, who falls in love with Markéta. She serves at Castle. Jan is forced to a journey. He retrieves a napkin, allowing him to be invisible, and defeats a dragon.

Cast
 Miroslav Šimůnek as Jan
 Michaela Kuklová as Markéta
 Daniel Hůlka as Brambas
 Vladimír Brabec as King
 Sabina Laurinová as Princess Eufrozína
 Lukáš Vaculík as Kujbaba

References

External links 
 

1990s fantasy adventure films
Films about dragons
Czech fantasy adventure films
Dragons in popular culture
Films based on fairy tales
1990s Czech-language films
Films directed by Zdeněk Troška